Joshua Isaac (born 28 October 2000) is a Grenadian footballer who currently plays for GFA Premier League club Paradise FC International and the Grenada national team.

Club career
Isaac had played for Paradise FC International youth since at least 2017. In 2019 he was named the MVP of the football competition at the Windward Islands Secondary School Games in Saint Lucia.

International career
Isaac represented Grenada at the youth level at the 2018 CONCACAF U-20 Championship. He made his senior international debut on 30 March 2021 in a 2022 FIFA World Cup qualification match against the US Virgin Islands. In August 2022 he was called up to the national team again, this time for friendlies in preparation for Grenada's final match of 2022–23 CONCACAF Nations League A in March 2023.

On 1 October 2022 he scored a first-half hattrick against Saint Vincent and the Grenadines in a 5–1 friendly victory. In a three-match series of friendlies between Grenada and Barbados in February 2023, Isaac scored a late goal to ensure a draw. Two days later he scored again to secure another 2–2 result.

Youth international goals
Scores and results list Grenada's goal tally first.

References

External links
National Football Teams profile
Soccerway profile
GFA profile
Global Sports Archive profile

Living people
2000 births
Grenadian footballers
Association football forwards